The Massachusetts State Auditor is a statewide elected office in the Commonwealth of Massachusetts responsible for conducting independent and objective performance audits of the executive branch of state government, be it state programs, departments, agencies, authorities, contracts, or vendors. The state auditor also investigates alleged or suspected instances of waste, fraud, and abuse in state government and ascertains whether state laws impose burdensome mandates on local governments. The current State Auditor is Diana DiZoglio (D).

Qualifications
Any person seeking to become State Auditor of Massachusetts must meet the following requirements:
 Be at least eighteen years of age
 Be a registered voter in Massachusetts
 Be a Massachusetts resident for at least five years when elected
 Receive 5,000 signatures from registered voters on nomination papers

List of State Auditors of Massachusetts

References

External links
 
 . (Various documents).

Government audit
State auditors of Massachusetts
1849 establishments in Massachusetts